Dinar is a currency unit.

Denar may also refer to:

Currency
 Dinar, a currency unit
 Macedonian denar
 Polish silver denar coin pictured on the reverse of some Polish złoty banknotes
 Bohemian coin replaced by Prague groschen
Banovac or banski denar, a historic Croatian coin

Other uses
 , a Turkish research and survey vessel
 Denar, a published work of Slavko Pregl
 Kay Denar, songwriter (see :Category:Songs written by Kay Denar)

See also 
 Dinar (disambiguation)